Craven Park (currently known as the Sewell Group Craven Park Stadium for sponsorship reasons) is a rugby league stadium located in Kingston upon Hull, East Riding of Yorkshire, England. It is the home of Hull Kingston Rovers, one of two professional rugby league teams based in the city.

History
Hull Kingston Rovers moved to the new ground in 1989 from the Old Craven Park which was sited on Holderness Road. The new stadium was the first in Rugby League to offer hospitality boxes. The stadium was the former home to the Hull Vikings speedway team, but they left when the ground was refurbished for Hull Kingston Rovers to use in the Super League. The first match was played against Trafford Borough with a full capacity 8,500 crowd to watch. The club convincingly started the new era, and in that season were crowned Division Two champions.

In 2006 the ground and pitch were substantially improved as the club sought a return to the top flight of English rugby league. Plans for Hull Kingston Rovers to move from Craven Park to a new purpose-built rugby league stadium to be constructed at a new, unconfirmed site were suggested in 2007, but shortly after this, Hull City Council, in partnership with Kingston Community Developments Limited and Hull Kingston Rovers, announced that terms for lease agreements had been reached to support the long-term future of Craven Park. These terms enabled investment and development of the stadium to move forward.

The initial phase of redeveloping Craven Park was the lease purchase of a temporary seated north stand from Wentworth Golf Club, replacing the use of the inadequate south terrace for visiting away fans. Hull Kingston Rovers' second season in the Super League in 2008 coincided with work beginning on the extension of the standing terraced East Stand. This extension increased the capacity of the stand by 1,120 bringing its overall capacity to 4,750. A similar extension to the opposite end of the stand, which would increase the capacity again by 1,200, was planned in 2009, but this expansion was placed on hold in 2011 as construction of a new North Stand took priority.

Construction work on the new £8.2 million mixed facilities North Stand began in 2012 following the removal of the temporary Wentworth Golf Club stand. The new stand was initially projected to be completed halfway through the 2013 season with the opening match set to be a Hull FC derby, however disputes between the club, Hull City Council and construction managers NPS saw the opening delayed to 2014. The disputes saw the North Stand cladded in sky blue rather than red as originally planned and club director Neil Hudgell fearing the stand would become a "glorified office block". Following its opening, the new North Stand would be named the 'Colin Hutton North Stand' as a tribute to the former Hull KR coach and the Great Britain national rugby league team coach.

A new attendance record was set at Craven Park in 2018, beating the previous record of 11,181 in the season opener against the Leeds Rhinos in 2015. 12,090 spectators attended the stadium to watch cross city rivals Hull FC defeat Hull Kingston Rovers in a Good Friday derby.

A floodlight collapse in November 2018 saw Hull Kingston Rovers declare a 'major incident' and relocate players and staff to the University of Hull for off-season training. One pre-season match in 2019 was relocated and the club would return to Craven Park in late January using a temporary floodlight.

The COVID-19 pandemic saw all Super League teams play behind closed doors at two neutral venues for a majority of the 2020 season and two rounds of the 2021 season, with only a handful of matches being played with no fans at Craven Park in 2021. When crowds returned to season ticket holders only in May 2021, initial restrictions on crowd capacity would see the club erect a temporary seated stand over the disused South Stand, allowing a socially-distanced capacity of 6,000. The temporary stand would be removed following the lifting of social distancing restrictions and replaced with a food and entertainment area on the site named 'Craven Streat', inspired by the fan park of Canadian Super League expansion team Toronto Wolfpack's Lamport Stadium and American football tailgate parties. The name references the Craven Street Football Ground, the site of Hull Kingston Rovers' first rugby league matches.

Craven Park and adjacent land surrounding the stadium had previously been owned and operated by both Hull City Council and Kingston Community Developments Ltd, who had held a 250-year lease of the stadium, since Hull Kingston Rovers was rescued from administration in 2000. Following a period of negotiations between the club and Hull City Council, Hull Kingston Rovers purchased full ownership of the stadium in March 2022, with the option to purchase 15 acres of surrounding land also included in the deal. 

With Craven Park under the ownership of Hull Kingston Rovers, the club plans to redevelop or improve parts of the ground. Plans have been proposed to build a sports campus, including new team training facilities, a 3G pitch, a gym and lecture hall, located on a site used for car parking near the South Terrace. The club also plans to demolish the Roger Millward West Stand and replace it with a new structure capable of hosting corporate facilities. Other planned additions include a permanent electronic scoreboard and pitch-side electronic advertising hoardings.

Layout

Colin Hutton North Stand

Capacity- 2,600 (seated)
The North Stand was originally a temporary stand from Wentworth Golf Club that was erected after the ground ceased being used as a speedway and greyhound racing venue. In 2013, the new £8 million Colin Hutton North Stand opened for the 2013 Rugby League World Cup game between Papua New Guinea and France. The North Stand also houses the Enterprise Business Centre and Training Centre. There are 42 fully furnished offices which make up the Enterprise Units, all of which are located on different floors within the North Stand.

Hull College West Stand

Capacity- 5,000 (seated)
The West Stand, also named after the clubs greatest player Roger Millward, includes the main seated stand a small terraced area, 'The Colin McNicol Well', below executive boxes, which holds around 500 fans and is also home to a large mural, painted in 2018, that celebrates Hull's maritime heritage. The stand houses the stadium's main changing rooms that were redeveloped before the 2014 season to improve the size and facilities of the changing room. Inside the stand there is The Robins Nest, Flanagan's Bar, named after former player Peter Flanagan and The Harry Poole Bar for home and away fans. This is a restaurant with pitch side views and exclusive player and coach interviews after a match. The stand also houses the TV gantry.

AC Enviro East Stand

Capacity- (standing)
The East Stand is considered the Kop end of the ground and is covered terrace that runs almost the full length of the pitch. The right side was extended in 2008, and the left side is planned for future expansion, however the project was placed on hold in 2011 due to the development of the North Stand.

'Craven Streat'

Previously a small bank of terracing at the south end of the ground. 'Craven Streat' offers live stage entertainment, Marquee with bars, local independent street food and big screen in a "relaxed festival atmosphere", the area has become a popular 'go-to' place for supporters to enjoy ahead of 80 minutes of Rugby League. The name of the new entertainment village takes its inspiration from the former Craven Street Football Ground, which the club departed almost 100 years ago.

Following the completion of the Roger Millward North Stand, the club proposed in 2015 to build a new South Stand and hotel to replace the disused terracing. Funding is yet to be acquired for the development.

Naming rights
In 2011, local data communications company MS3 announced it had secured a five-year deal for the naming rights of Craven Park, the first such deal in the club's history. Fans of Hull Kingston Rovers voted on adopting either the name MS3 Craven Park or MS3 Stadium, with the vote resulting in the stadium being renamed MS3 Craven Park.

On 25 January 2014, Hull Kingston Rovers announced that it had secured a new stadium naming rights partnership with local communications provider, KC. Under a five-year agreement, Craven Park was renamed the KC Lightstream Stadium (following re-branding, it became the KCOM Lightstream Stadium), not to be confused with the KCOM Stadium in the west of the city. On 3 February 2017, it was renamed again, and was then known as KCOM Craven Park.

On 21 August 2019, Hull Kingston Rovers announced a new partnership with Hull College, which would see the stadium renamed to Hull College Craven Park Stadium. This partnership also helped provide new training opportunities for academy players, as well as providing Hull Kingston Rovers players to pursue degrees at the college.

On 18 January 2022, Hull Kingston Rovers announced a new name for Craven Park after confirming a two-year partnership with the Sewell Group. The deal would see the stadium be renamed to Sewell Group Craven Park.

Other usage

Concerts
Craven Park hosted its first concert in 2017, with 20,000 attending a concert starring the former vocalists of The Housemartins and The Beautiful South Paul Heaton and Jacqui Abbott on 3 June, supported by guests Billy Bragg and The Divine Comedy.

Little Mix first performed at Craven Park to a crowd of 20,000 in July 2018 as part of their "Summer Hits Tour". They were originally scheduled to perform again in June 2020 until the COVID-19 pandemic forced the 2020 tour's cancellation.

Westlife were scheduled to perform at Craven Park on 10 July 2020 for their reunion "Stadiums in the Summer Tour" before the tour was cancelled due to the COVID-19 pandemic. Sir Tom Jones was also scheduled to perform at Craven Park on 13 June 2020, however the concert was initially cancelled, then rescheduled to September 2021.

The Who are to perform at Craven Park with a live orchestra as the first UK venue of their "The Who Hits Back!" tour, supported by UB40, on 6 July 2023.

Association football
On 21 October 2015, it was announced that Non-League football team Hull United A.F.C. will play their home games at the stadium.

Greyhound racing
The greyhound racing operation followed Hull Kingston Rovers to their new home from Old Craven Park after it closed in 1989. The first race meeting was held on 11 November 1989. The management team of John Kennedy and Roy Thickett had overseen the move and set up racing for Monday, Thursday and Saturday nights. The new circuit had a circumference of 415 metres and race distances of 290, 462, 490, 655 & 705 metres. Prentice Racing came in as new promoters during the nineties but the racing switched to the Boulevard Stadium in 2003. Both the speedway and greyhound tracks were grassed over.

Track records

Speedway

Speedway arrived in 1995 hosting the Hull Vikings but finished in 2005.

Boxing
In 2015, Craven Park hosted the 'Rumble on the Humber', where after ten rounds, Olympic gold medalist Luke Campbell defeated local rival Tommy Coyle, with crowds numbering around about 15,000.

Quidditch
On 26 August 2017, Craven Park hosted the first ever Championship fixture of the Quidditch Premier League. The fixture involved eight teams from two regional divisions (North Division and South Division), and the winners were the West Midlands Revolution.

Rugby league internationals
Craven Park has hosted six rugby league internationals.

The list of international rugby league matches played at Craven Park is:

References

External links

 New Craven Park stadium on Worldstadia.com

Rugby league stadiums in England
Rugby League World Cup stadiums
Hull Kingston Rovers
Defunct greyhound racing venues in the United Kingdom
Defunct speedway venues in England
Sports venues in Kingston upon Hull
Sports venues completed in 1989